Vanadium(V) oxytrifluoride is a chemical compound with the formula VOF3.  It is one of several vanadium(V) oxyhalides.  VOF3 is a yellowish orange powder that is sensitive to moisture. Characteristic of early metal fluorides, the structure is polymeric in the solid state. The solid adopts a layered structure but upon evaporation, the species becomes dimeric.  In contrast VOCl3 and VOBr3 remain tetrahedral in all states, being volatile liquids at room temperature.

In organic synthesis, VOF3 is often used for the oxidative coupling of phenolic rings, for example in the syntheses of vancomycin and its analogues. For these applications VOF3 is typically dissolved in trifluoroacetic acid.

References

Oxyfluorides
Vanadium(V) compounds
Vanadyl compounds